American College of Occupational and Environmental Medicine (ACOEM) is a United States-based professional society for health care professionals in the field of occupational safety and health. ACOEM is the pre-eminent physician-led organization that champions the health of workers, safety of workplaces, and quality of environments.

History
The American Occupational Medical Association was created in 1916. The American Academy of Occupational Medicine was created in 1946. In 1988, both organizations were merged to form the present day American College of Occupational and Environmental Medicine.

Background 
The American College of Occupational and Environmental Medicine (ACOEM) is dedicated to promoting the health of workers through preventive medicine, clinical care, research, and education. It is headquartered in Elk Grove Village, Illinois. ACOEM membership consists of physicians and allied health professionals in a variety of medical practices. ACOEM develops policies and position statements on issues related to occupational and environmental medicine. While a national organization, ACOEM is composed of regional component societies in the United States and Canada, whose members hold regular scientific meetings and networking events. ACOEM hosts its annual American Occupational Health Conference (AOHC) each spring. ACOEM offers continuing education courses including Foundations in Occupational Medicine, Occupational Medicine Board Review, and Impairment and Disability Evaluation, and offers training for MRO Drug/Alcohol Testing and Commercial Driver Medical Examiners.

ACOEM mission 
ACOEM provides leadership to promote optimal health and safety of workers, workplaces, and environments by:

 educating health professionals and the public;
 stimulating research;
 enhancing the quality of practice;
 guiding workplace and public policy; and
 advancing the field of occupational and environmental medicine.

OEM mission 
Occupational and environmental medicine (OEM) is the medicine specialty devoted to prevention and management of occupational and environmental injury, illness and disability, and promotion of health and productivity of workers, their families, and communities.

ACOEM, an international society of more than 4,500 occupational physicians and associated professionals, provides leadership to promote optimal health and safety of workers, workplaces, and environments.

Publications 
ACOEM publishes the Journal of Occupational and Environmental Medicine (JOEM), a scientific, peer-reviewed monthly publication in the specialty of occupational and environmental medicine offering clinically oriented research articles and technical reports. ACOEM has several electronic newsletters, including ACOEM E-News, MRO Update newsletter, and CDME Review newsletter. ACOEM also publishes the online Guidance for the Medical Evaluation of Law Enforcement Officers (LEOs), and the Occupational Medicine Practice Guidelines.

ACOEM authors position papers providing guidance for a variety of topics such as spirometry, noise-induced hearing loss, obesity, workplace drug screening, confidentiality of medical information, depression screening, and reproductive hazards. ACOEM has also established a Code of Ethical Conduct to guide occupational and environmental physicians.

American Occupational Health Conference (AOHC) 
The American Occupational Health Conference (AOHC) is the premier professional meeting for physicians and other health professionals who have an interest in the fields of occupational and environmental medicine (OEM). It is also the annual membership meeting for ACOEM's members. More than 1,300 people from around the globe convene to learn from each other, share knowledge, and connect through shared experience at AOHC, the largest gathering of occupational and environmental health professionals in the world.

Future AOHC conferences 

 2020: Washington, DC
 2021: Austin, TX
 2022: Salt Lake City, UT
 2023: Philadelphia, PA

References

External links

Journal of Occupational and Environmental Medicine
ACOEM Guidelines 
Occupational and Environmental Health Foundation (OEHF)
Excellence in Corporate Health Achievement Award (eCHAA)
American Occupational Health Conference (AOHC)
Guidance for the Medical Evaluation of Law Enforcement Officers (LEOs)
Medical Review Officer Center (MROs)
Commercial Driver Medical Examiner Center (CDMEs)

Medical associations based in the United States
Occupational safety and health
Environmental social science
Medical and health organizations based in Illinois